Paidiscura pallens is a species of comb-footed spider in the family Theridiidae. It is found in the Mediterranean, Middle East, the Caucasus and Great Britain. Females of this species make distinctive white sputnik shaped egg cocoons, usually on oak leaves, and often remain nearby.

References

Theridiidae
Spiders described in 1834